The Southern Riders' Championship was an individual speedway competition inaugurated in 1958 for top riders of teams from the South of Great Britain and staged intermittently until 1991.

Winners

* 1962 and 1964 - Provincial League Southern Riders Championship

References

Speedway competitions in the United Kingdom